Michael Moyles is a former Gaelic footballer who played for Crossmolina and the Mayo county team. He is the current manager of the Mayo ladies' football team.

Background
Moyles is from the St Mary's Park area of Crossmolina, County Mayo, Ireland where he was educated at Crossmolina St Tiernan's Boys' National School and Gortnor Abbey Secondary School. He was introduced to Gaelic by his primary school teacher John Cosgrove. Moyles played alongside Ciarán McDonald for Crossmolina and Mayo.
He represented Mayo at all levels.

Personal life
Moyles is currently a teacher in St Tiernan's College, Crossmolina.

Player
Moyles came through the Crossmolina Deel Rovers system alongside Ciarán McDonald, Peadár Gardiner and Stephen Rochford. He was part of the talented Crossmolina team that won six Moclair Cups between 1995 and 2006.
Moyles won the Sigerson Cup with Sligo IT in 2004, but his career was cut short due to a spinal injury. 

Moyles has Connacht Championship, National League, Sigerson Cup and All-Ireland club Championship medals.

Coaching career
Moyles coached at various levels including the Sligo Minor team. He has coached in various roles throughout Connacht and has developed a good reputation on his knowledge of the game. His townsman and former teammate Stephen Rochford is the current Mayo Manager.

Moyles was a coach for Knockmore, helping them to the semi finals of the 2015 Mayo Championship and the final in the following year.

In January 2021 Moyles was announced as the new Mayo LGFA manager, and coached the side to semi-final appearances in both the league and championship campaigns.

Quotes

References

1977 births
Living people
Crossmolina Gaelic footballers
Irish schoolteachers
Ladies' Gaelic football managers
Leitrim county football team
Mayo inter-county Gaelic footballers
People from Castlebar